Castle Rock is a geological limestone stack and tourist attraction located 3 miles (5 km) north of St. Ignace, Michigan on Interstate 75 in Michigan's Upper Peninsula.

Description
Castle Rock, which rises 195.8 feet (59 m) over the waters of nearby Lake Huron, was created by erosion of surrounding land.  After the Wisconsinan Glaciation, post-glacial Lake Algonquin formed.  The Ice Age melt off caused the waters of Lake Algonquin to be much higher than the water level of Lake Huron is today.  Over time, the declining water eroded much of the land.  Castle Rock, which resisted this erosion, is made of limestone breccia; it is a sea stack or sea chimney, geologically similar to several features on nearby Mackinac Island, such as Arch Rock or Sugar Loaf.

Local residents have told many stories about Castle Rock and its mythical and actual history. It has been advertised as "Ojibway's Lookout", but the nearby hill of Rabbit's Back was more than likely the true lookout.  Heroic statues of Paul Bunyan and his sidekick, Babe the Blue Ox, greet visitors to the rock, and there is a gift shop.

C. C. Eby purchased the stack and an adjacent tourist stand in 1928, and opened Castle Rock to the public.  It continues to be owned and operated by the Eby family as a seasonal tourist attraction.  It is open for business from mid- May through mid-October. Visitors are encouraged to climb an outdoor staircase to the top of the rock.  A small admission fee is charged.

Gallery

See also
 Rabbit's Back
 St. Anthony's Rock
 Straits of Mackinac

References

Geology of Michigan
Landforms of Mackinac County, Michigan
Tourist attractions in Mackinac County, Michigan
Roadside attractions in Michigan
Stacks of the United States